The first season of animated series "The Dukes Of Broxstonia" first broadcast on ABC3 Australia on 2 August 2010 and ended on 2 January 2011. It contains 10 episodes available as 40 seconds episodes, in 480 SD format. The season began with "Ear Ache" and ended with "On TV".

Episode List

2010 Australian television seasons
2011 Australian television seasons